Kevin Patterson may refer to:

 Kevin Patterson (writer) (born 1964), Canadian medical doctor and writer
 Kevin Patterson (singer) (born 1960), Scottish songwriter and singer
 Kevin the Teenager, a character created and played by the British comedian Harry Enfield